Carla Hagen (born 11 September 1932) is a German film and television actress.

Selected filmography
 Professor Nachtfalter (1951)
 The Happy Village (1955)
 Yes, Yes, Love in Tyrol (1955)
 The Double Husband (1955)
 The First Day of Spring (1956)
 If We All Were Angels (1956)
 Black Forest Melody (1956)
 Lemke's Widow (1957)
 Two Hearts in May (1958)
 Love, Girls and Soldiers (1958)
 Girl from Hong Kong (1961)

References

Bibliography
 Klossner, Michael. The Europe of 1500-1815 on Film and Television: A Worldwide Filmography of Over 2550 Works, 1895 Through 2000. McFarland, 2002.

External links

1931 births
Living people
German television actresses
German film actresses
Actresses from Hamburg